Leroy Russel Burrell (born February 21, 1967) is an American former track and field athlete, who twice set the world record for the 100 m sprint.

Early life

Burrell grew up in Lansdowne, Pennsylvania, and attended Penn Wood High School, where he single-handedly won the state championship by winning the 100 m, 200 m, long jump, and triple jump. Suffering from poor eyesight accentuated by a childhood eye injury, he was poor at other sports, but excelled on the track from an early age. He attended the University of Houston from 1986 to 1990, where he was a nine-time NCAA All-American and set the NCAA outdoor record in the long jump.

Professional career
Burrell was plagued by injuries and bad luck throughout his career, particularly around major championships. He won gold in the 100 m ahead of Carl Lewis at the 1990 Goodwill Games in Seattle. He won the silver in the 100 m behind Lewis at the 1991 World Championships. At the 1992 Summer Olympics in Barcelona, Burrell false-started in the 100 m final. When the race finally restarted, his reaction off the line was slow, and he finished fifth. He did manage to win a relay gold as part of the U.S. 4 × 100 m team.

On May 19, 1990, Burrell ran a wind-assisted 200 m at College Station, Texas, in a time of 19.61 seconds. The wind speed was +4.0 m per second. This was the fastest time for the 200 m for over six years until the 1996 Olympic final in Atlanta, where Michael Johnson ran 19.32 seconds.

He first set the 100m world record in June 1991 with a time of 9.90 seconds. This was broken that September by Carl Lewis who ran 9.86 sec at the 1991 World Track and Field Championships where Burrell finished second in a new personal best time of 9.88 sec. In July 1994, Burrell set the world record for the second time when he ran 9.85 sec (a record that stood until the 1996 Olympics when Donovan Bailey ran 9.84 sec).

Since his retirement in 1998, Burrell has replaced his old college mentor, Tom Tellez, as coach of the University of Houston's track and field team. Burrell has led UH to 14 men's Conference USA titles (nine indoor, five outdoor) and nine women's titles (four indoor, five outdoor). He was inducted into the Texas Track and Field Coaches Hall of Fame in 2014.

In June 2022, Burrell stepped down as head coach at Houston and accepted the head coaching position for Auburn track and field.

Personal life
Burrell married Michelle Finn, also a sprinter, in 1994, and they have three sons together: Cameron who was a sprinter for the Houston Cougars and died in 2021, Joshua, and Jaden. On June 7, 2017, Cameron joined his father in the sub-10 second club. Burrell's younger sister Dawn also competed in track and field at the highest level, as a member of the 2000 US Olympic team and world indoor champion in the long jump.

Statistics
Information from IAAF profile unless otherwise noted.

World records
Includes former all-conditions world best in the 200 meters. All world records are former as of May 24, 2014.

Personal bests

Sprints

Jumps

International championship results

National championship results

Circuit wins

Overall
IAAF Grand Prix: 1990

100 meters
IAAF Grand Prix: 1990
Athens: 1990

Notes

References

External links

Leroy Burrell hall of fame bio at USATF
Leroy Burrell bio at the Houston Cougars

Videos 
Carl Lewis & friends: The fantastic four in Barcelona 1992 by the Olympic Channel via YouTube

1967 births
Living people
Sportspeople from Delaware County, Pennsylvania
People from Lansdowne, Pennsylvania
Track and field athletes from Philadelphia
American male sprinters
American male long jumpers
African-American male track and field athletes
World record setters in athletics (track and field)
Olympic gold medalists for the United States in track and field
Athletes (track and field) at the 1992 Summer Olympics
World Athletics Championships medalists
World Athletics Championships athletes for the United States
Houston Cougars men's track and field athletes
Medalists at the 1992 Summer Olympics
Goodwill Games medalists in athletics
USA Outdoor Track and Field Championships winners
USA Indoor Track and Field Championships winners
World Athletics Championships winners
Competitors at the 1990 Goodwill Games
Competitors at the 1994 Goodwill Games
21st-century African-American people
20th-century African-American sportspeople